

Final standings

ACC tournament
See 1962 ACC men's basketball tournament

NCAA tournament

Round of 25
Wake Forest    92, Yale       82 (ot)

Regional semi-finals
Wake Forest    96, Saint Joseph's 85

Regional finals
Wake Forest    79, Villanova    69

National semi-finals
Ohio State     84, Wake Forest  68

National third place
Wake Forest    82, UCLA         80

ACC's NCAA record
4–1

NIT
League rules prevented ACC teams from playing in the NIT, 1954–1966

External links
 https://web.archive.org/web/20080619014226/http://www.sportsstats.com/bball/standings/1962